The 1952 United States presidential election in Utah took place on November 4, 1952, as part of the 1952 United States presidential election. State voters chose four representatives, or electors, to the Electoral College, who voted for President and Vice-President.

Utah was won by Columbia University President Dwight D. Eisenhower (R–New York), running with Senator Richard Nixon, with 58.93 percent of the popular vote, against Adlai Stevenson (D–Illinois), running with Senator John Sparkman, with 41.07 percent of the popular vote. This was the first time since 1928 that Utah backed a Republican in a presidential election.

Results

Results by county

See also
 United States presidential elections in Utah

References

Utah
1952
1952 Utah elections